Danny O'Bryant is an American former professional tennis player.

A native of Texas, O'Bryant attended Sabinal High School and was a three-time UIL Class A singles champion, as well as an All-Star state high school basketball player.

O'Bryant played varsity tennis for Trinity University, earning All-American honors in 1969 after reaching the NCAA singles quarter-finals and doubles semi-finals. Graduating that year, he then turned professional and during his time on tour made the main draw of the French Open. He had a career win over Australian Davis Cup player Dick Crealy.

References

External links
 
 

Year of birth missing (living people)
Living people
American male tennis players
Trinity Tigers men's tennis players
Tennis people from Texas
People from Sabinal, Texas